The 1932 New Zealand rugby union tour to Australia was the 14th tour by the New Zealand national rugby union team to Australia.

The tour 
Scores and results list New Zealand's points tally first.

External links 
 New Zealand in Australia 1932 from rugbymuseum.co.nz
 Australian and New Zealand Team Photos

New Zealand
New Zealand tour
Australia tour
New Zealand national rugby union team tours of Australia